Stig-Olof Grenner (6 May 1939 – 14 March 2008) was a Finnish swimmer. He competed in three events at the 1960 Summer Olympics.

References

External links
 

1939 births
2008 deaths
Finnish male freestyle swimmers
Finnish male backstroke swimmers
Olympic swimmers of Finland
Swimmers at the 1960 Summer Olympics
Swimmers from Helsinki